Gulumaal: The Escape is a 2009 Indian Malayalam-language comedy film directed by V. K. Prakash and written by Rajesh Y. V. It was shot in digital format by cinematographer Fowzia Fathima, and starred Kunchacko Boban and Jayasurya. The film is an unofficial remake of the Argentinian crime-thriller film Nine Queens. The film was remade in Telugu as All the Best (2012).

Plot 
Jerry Mathews  a con man known for his high-stakes scams. His criminal actions create a rift in his family when he attempts to steal the family business from his sister. While planning a heist on a petrol station, Jerry helps an escaped convict, Ravi Varma. Ravi had been caught performing similar heists with a similar con man.

Ravi convinces Jerry to plan a formidable heist. An old acquaintance, Bose, tells Jerry of a forged painting that can be used to con a non-resident Indian (NRI) out of 50 lakhs. The information creates a rift in the newly formed friendship as both Ravi and Jerry attempt to outdo each other in order to take the money.

Coincidentally, Jerry's sister Saira is an employee at the hotel where the NRI is staying, and both Ravi and the NRI fall in love with her.

Ravi and Jerry eventually lose the painting and decide to buy the original by pooling their money. They then sell it to the NRI for 3 crore. However, Jerry's father finds out about the plot and tells Saira, which further drives the siblings apart.

When Jerry and Ravi realize that the check given to them is invalid, they fight and decide to part ways. Jerry runs into the master con man, Bose, who offers to help him resolve the situation, and takes Jerry to the wedding of Ravi's and Saira's. Jerry learns that the entire sequence of events, starting from the gas station incident, had been completely staged as a form of gentle revenge in return for the scam that had sent Ravi's father Prabhakaran to jail.

Jerry asks for forgiveness from everyone and leaves the wedding. As the credits roll, Jerry is seen pondering another scam.

Cast

 Kunchacko Boban as Ravi Varma
 Jayasurya as Jerry Mathews 
 Mithra Kurian as Saira Mathews
 Nedumudi Venu as Prabhakara Varma
 Suraj Venjaramoodu as ATS Shambhu
 Salim Kumar as Bhai
 Bijukuttan as Constable Stephen
 Kottayam Nazeer as Appy Biju
 Devan as NRI
 Maniyanpilla Raju as Rangaswami / Ahammedkutty 
 Gita Nair as Ravi's mother
 Abhirami Suresh as Ravi's sister
 Roslin as Jerry's mother 
 Valsala Menon as Thampuratty
 Samvrutha Sunil as herself (cameo)
 Siddique as himself (cameo)
 Chali Pala 
 Deepika Mohan
 Vimal Roshan

Reception
The film was described as being similar to Fabián Bielinsky's 2000 Argentine crime drama film Nine Queens (Nueve Reinas). V. K. Prakash said: "I discovered the Nine Queens connection only after I liked the subject of Gulumaal".

Sify.com stated that "with a tighter script, better music and lesser length the film could have been even more entertaining", but added, "The best thing about the film could be its unconventional narrative style." Indiaglitz.com called it "stylish and crazy entertainment", praising the film's "intense believability" and "unstoppable flow of brilliantly witty one-liners", but criticized the poor selection of voices in Manu Rameshan's songs. VN of Nowrunning.com gave the film 2.5 out of 5, praising "the amazing camaraderie that its lead actors share" but finding fault with the "cacophony" and substandard picturization of the songs. VN also stated that Gulumal was "a straight lift off the Argentinian film Nueve Reinas (Nine Queens)".

Box office
The film was commercial success.

Sound Track 
The film's soundtrack contains 4 songs, all composed by Manu Ramesan, with lyrics by S. Ramesan Nair and Saimon Palvaay.

References

External links
 

2000s Malayalam-language films
2000s crime comedy films
Indian remakes of foreign films
Indian crime comedy films
Films directed by V. K. Prakash
2009 comedy films
2009 films
Malayalam films remade in other languages